Lærke Sørensen (born 6 February 1998) is a Danish handballer for Skara HF.

She also represented Denmark in the 2015 European Women's U-17 Handball Championship in Macedonia, leading to the trophy.

Achievements 
Youth World Championship:
Silver Medalist: 2016
European Youth Championship:
Winner: 2015
Junior European Championship:
Silver Medalist: 2017

Individual awards 
 All-Star Goalkeeper of the EHF U-17 European Championship: 2015 
 All-Star Goalkeeper of the IHF Youth World Championship: 2016

References
 

  
1998 births
Living people
Sportspeople from Aarhus
Danish female handball players